Mohammed Saad Al Badr (Arabic:محمد سعد البدر) (born 2 February 1997) is a Qatari footballer. He currently plays as a midfielder for Mesaimeer.

Career
Al Badr started his career at Al-Arabi and is a product of the Al-Arabi's youth system. On 24 January 2020, Al Badr made his professional debut for Al-Arabi against Al-Duhail in the Pro League, replacing Ahmed Fatehi. And renewed his contract with Al-Arabi on 16 June 2020.

References

External links

1997 births
Living people
Qatari footballers
Al-Arabi SC (Qatar) players
Al-Shamal SC players
Mesaimeer SC players
Qatar Stars League players
Qatari Second Division players
Association football midfielders
Place of birth missing (living people)